Maan Gaye Mughal-E-Azam, is a 2008 Indian Hindi-language crime comedy film about a group of actors who attempt to prevent an underworld conspiracy from destabilizing the Indian government. The film is set in 1993 after the communal riots that followed the demolition of the Babri Masjid. The film stars Rahul Bose and Mallika Sherawat and was directed and written by Sanjay Chhel. The movie is loosely based on the 1983 movie To Be or Not to Be which itself was based on the 1942 movie of the same name.

Plot
When the Kalakar Theatre Company, a theatre group in Goa, attempts to stage a political drama, the local authorities close down the play and force them to perform a more traditional play, a stage version of Mughal-E-Azam. The company then discovers that an underworld don is engineering a bomb blast to shake confidence in the Indian government. The drama company forms a plan to save the entire city from the blast. The actors, led by their producer Uday (Paresh Rawal), are assisted by RAW agent Arjun Rastogi (Rahul Bose) in their efforts to foil the bombing. Arjun falls in love with Uday's wife, Shabnam (Mallika Sherawat) who also becomes involved with an ISI agent (Kay Kay Menon). Performing multiple roles in disguise, the characters eventually save the entire nation from the bomb blast.

Soundtrack
"Ek Toh Sharab Kam" - Pankaj Udhas
"Aaj Mood Hai Ishqaiyaan" - Sunidhi Chauhan
"Ishquiyaan (Remix)" - Sonu Nigam
"Marmari Baahe (Remix)" - Anu Malik, Mahalakshmi Iyer
"Marmari Baahein, Sandhali Saansein" - Kunal Ganjawala, Mahalakshmi Iyer
"Pyar Kiya Toh Darna Kya" - Shaan, Mahalakshmi Iyer, Ishq Bector, Anushka Manchanda
"Khuda Mere Ishq Khuda" - Mohit Chauhan & Sonu Nigam
"Maine Pyar Kyun Kiya" - Kunal Ganjawala

Cast
Mallika Sherawat as Shabnam Kapoor 
Rahul Bose as Arjun Khanna
Paresh Rawal as Uday Shankar Mazumdar
Kay Kay Menon as Haldi Hassan
Rajeev Khandelwal as Ahmed Bhoy
Manoj Joshi as Police Inspector Patil 
Zakir Hussain as Show Director Dubey 
Pawan Malhotra as Qayyum Cable (Maut ka Label)
Viju Khote (Vijoo Khote)
Homi Wadia
Tannaz Irani as Champa

Reception
Maan Gaye Mughal-E-Azam received mostly negative reviews from critics. Khalid Mohamed writing for Hindustan Times gave the film 1 star out of 5, stating ″Although Chhel can be a sparkling dialogue writer, here both his lines and direction are as flat as week-old beer. Evidently, inspired by Ernst Lubitsch’s 1942 comedy, To Be or Not To Be (wow, man what sources!), this Mallika-e-Azam is about her bare back, bling costumes and a plot that would need a research team to deconstruct.″ and was termed "deliriously bad" by Anupama Chopra. It also performed poorly at the box office.

References

External links

Films scored by Anu Malik
2008 films
2000s Hindi-language films
Films set in 1993
Films set in Uttar Pradesh
Films about the Research and Analysis Wing
Indian remakes of American films